EHC St. Moritz is a Swiss ice hockey team.

Founded: 1918
Home arena: Eisarena Ludains (capacity 800)
Swiss Championships won: 3 (1922, 1923, 1928)
Nationalliga B Championships won: 1 (1954)

External links
 EHC St. Moritz official website

Ice hockey teams in Switzerland
Sport in St. Moritz